A derrick is a lifting device, especially in an oil field. Derricks may also refer to:

Anthony Derricks (born 1976), former Arena Football League defensive specialist/k.o. returner stand-out
Cleavant Derricks (actor) (born 1953), Tony Award-winning American actor and singer-songwriter
Cleavant Derricks (songwriter) (1910–1977), pastor and choir director at a number of black Baptist churches
Clinton Derricks-Carroll (born 1953), American actor and musician
Marguerite Derricks (born 1961), multi award-winning choreographer, ballerina and actress

See also
Derrick (disambiguation)
À l'ombre des derricks, Lucky Luke comic written by Goscinny
Work at Oil Derricks (Azerbaijani: Neft buruqlarında iş), a 1907 Azerbaijani film directed by Vasili Amaşukeli

Surnames from given names